The stream frog is a genus of pyxicephalid frogs native to Africa.

Stream frog may also refer to:

 Beautiful stream frog, a frog found in India, Bangladesh, and Nepal
 Chantaburi stream frog, a frog native to Thailand and Vietnam
 Dehradun stream frog, a frog found in India
 Greek stream frog, a frog found in Albania, Bosnia and Herzegovina, Bulgaria, Greece, Macedonia, Serbia and Montenegro, and possibly Turkey
 Italian stream frog, a frog found in Italy and San Marino
 Jaunsar stream frog, a frog found in Chakrata, Uttarakhand, India
 Leyte slender stream frog, a frog endemic to the Philippines
 Mountain stream frog, a frog found in Central America
 Palebrown stream frog, a frog found in India, Bangladesh, Myanmar, Thailand, and possibly Bhutan and Nepal
 Red stream frog, a frog found in Myanmar, Thailand, Malaysia, and India
 Red-eyed stream frog, a frog found in Costa Rica and Panama
 Sapgreen stream frog, a frog found in Cambodia, China, India, Indonesia, Laos, Malaysia, Myanmar, Thailand, Vietnam, and possibly Bangladesh
 Stream brown frog, a frog endemic to Japan
 Strong stream frog, a frog endemic to Taiwan
 Trinidadian stream frog, a frog endemic to Trinidad

See also
 Spotted stream frog (disambiguation)
 Stream tree frog (disambiguation)
 Striped stream frog (disambiguation)

Animal common name disambiguation pages